Cape Girardeau County is located in the southeastern part of the U.S. state of Missouri; its eastern border is formed by the Mississippi River. At the 2020 census, the population was 81,710. The county seat is Jackson, the first city in the US to be named in honor of President Andrew Jackson. Officially organized on October 1, 1812, the county is named after Ensign Sieur Jean Baptiste de Girardot, an official of the French colonial years. The "cape" in the county's name is named after a former promontory rock overlooking the Mississippi River; this feature was demolished during railroad construction. Cape Girardeau County is the hub of the Cape Girardeau–Jackson metropolitan area. Its largest city is Cape Girardeau.

History
Cape Girardeau County was organized on October 1, 1812, as one of five original counties in the Missouri Territory after the US made the Louisiana Purchase of 1803. It is named after Ensign Sieur Jean Baptiste de Girardot (also spelled Girardeau or Girardat), a French officer stationed 1704–1720 at Kaskaskia in the Illinois Country of New France. In 1733 he founded a trading post on the Mississippi River, which developed as the present-day city of Cape Girardeau. The "cape" in the county name was a rock promontory overlooking the Mississippi River and Claire's house; the original cape rock was destroyed by railroad construction.

Jackson, Missouri is the county seat. The first Cape Girardeau County Courthouse was constructed in 1818 by John Davis. This courthouse burned in 1870. The present courthouse in Jackson was completed in 1908 and was designed by P.H. Weathers.

The county is the site of one of the oldest cold cases in the state of Missouri. Bonnie Huffman, a 20-year-old schoolteacher, was found murdered in a ditch just outside Delta on July 2, 1954. Her case was never solved.

Cape Girardeau is referenced in Dave Van Ronk's song "Hang Me, Oh Hang Me," which has found a place in the folk canon since its release in 1962. The song was featured prominently in the 2013 film Inside Llewyn Davis. In the second verse, the singer refers to having "been all around Cape Girardeau and parts of Arkansas...poor boy, I've been all around this world."

Geography

The geography of Cape Girardeau County varies greatly. The areas around the towns of Delta and Dutchtown are flood plains, which were cultivated as cotton plantations. Western and northern areas are hilly and forested.

Adjacent counties
Perry County (northwest)
Union County, Illinois (northeast across the river)
Alexander County, Illinois (east across the Mississippi River)
Scott County (southeast)
Stoddard County (south)
Bollinger County (west)

Major highways
 Interstate 55
 U.S. Route 61
 Route 25
 Route 34
 Route 72

Demographics

As of the census of 2000, there were 68,693 people, 26,980 households, and 17,941 families residing in the county. There were 29,434 housing units at an average density of 51 per square mile (20/km2). The racial makeup of the county was 92.13% White, 5.28% Black or African American, 0.36% Native American, 0.75% Asian, 0.03% Pacific Islander, 0.31% from other races, and 1.15% from two or more races. Approximately 0.91% of the population were Hispanic or Latino of any race.

There were 26,980 households, out of which 31.20% had children under the age of 18 living with them, 53.80% were married couples living together, 9.80% had a female householder with no husband present, and 33.50% were non-families. 27.30% of all households were made up of individuals, and 10.10% had someone living alone who was 65 years of age or older. The average household size was 2.42 and the average family size was 2.96.

In the county, the population was spread out, with 23.40% under the age of 18, 13.40% from 18 to 24, 27.80% from 25 to 44, 21.60% from 45 to 64, and 13.80% who were 65 years of age or older. The median age was 35 years. For every 100 females, there were 93.20 males. For every 100 females age 18 and over, there were 90.00 males.

The median income for a household in the county was $45,862, and the median income for a family was $58,037. Males had a median income of $32,371 versus $20,833 for females. The per capita income for the county was $24,303. About 6.70% of families and 11.10% of the population were below the poverty line, including 11.40% of those under age 18 and 10.10% of those age 65 or over.

Religion
According to the Association of Religion Data Archives County Membership Report (2010), Cape Girardeau County is part of the Bible Belt, with evangelical Protestantism being the most predominant religion. The most predominant denominations among residents in Cape Girardeau County who adhere to a religion are Roman Catholics (19.19%), Assemblies of God (19.13%), and Lutherans (LCMS) (16.58%).

2020 Census

Education
Of adults 25 years of age and older in Cape Girardeau County, 81.1% possess a high school diploma or higher while 24.2% hold a bachelor's degree as their highest educational attainment.

Public schools
 Delta R-V School District—Delta
 Delta Elementary School (K–6)
 Delta High School (7–12) 
 Oak Ridge R-VI School District—Oak Ridge
 Oak Ridge Elementary School (K–6)
 Oak Ridge High School (7–12)
  Nell Holcomb R-IV School District—Egypt Mills
 Nell Holcomb Elementary School (K–8) 
 Jackson R-II School District—Jackson
 Gordonville Attendance Center (K–3)—Gordonville
 Millersville Attendance Center (K–3)—Millersville
 North Elementary School (K–5)
 Orchard Drive Elementary School (K–3)
 South Elementary School (PK–5)
 West Lane Elementary School (3–5) 
 Jackson Middle School (6–7)
 Russell Hawkins Jr. High School (8–9)
 Jackson High School (10–12) 
 Cape Girardeau Public Schools No. 63—Cape Girardeau 
 Alma Schrader Elementary School (K–4)
 Blanchard Elementary School (K–4)
 Clippard Elementary School (K–4)
 Franklin Elementary School (K–4)
 Jefferson Elementary School (K–4)
 Cape Central Middle School (5–6)
 Cape Central Jr. High School (7–8)
 Cape Central High School (9–12)
 Cape Girardeau Career & Technology Center (10–12)

Private schools
 Cape Christian School (K–8)—Cape Girardeau; Assembly of God/Pentecostal 
  St. Mary Cathedral School (K–8)—Cape Girardeau; Roman Catholic
 St. Vincent De Paul Elementary School (K–8)—Cape Girardeau; Roman Catholic 
 Trinity Lutheran School (PK–8)—Cape Girardeau; Lutheran 
 Immaculate Conception School (PK–8)—Jackson; Roman Catholic
 St. Paul Lutheran School (PK–8)—Jackson; Lutheran 
 Eagle Ridge Christian School (PK–12)—Cape Girardeau; Non-denominational Christian
  Notre Dame Regional High School (9–12)—Cape Girardeau; Roman Catholic 
  Saxony Lutheran High School (9–12)—Jackson/Fruitland; Lutheran

Post-secondary education
  Metro Business College—Cape Girardeau (Permanently Closed)
 Southeast Missouri State University—Cape Girardeau

Public libraries
Cape Girardeau Public Library  
Jackson Public Library  
Riverside Regional Library

Politics

Local
Since the late 20th century voters at the local level have switched from the Democratic Party to the Republican Party, which is now predominant in Cape Girardeau County. Republicans hold all of the elected positions in the county.

State

In the Missouri House of Representatives, Cape Girardeau County is divided into two legislative districts, both of which are represented by Republicans.

District 146 – Consists of most of the entire county outside of the city of Cape Girardeau, although a small portion of the northern edge of the city is included in this district. The district also takes in all of the city of Jackson as well as the communities of Pocahontas, Oak Ridge, Old Appleton, Gordonville, Dutchtown, Delta, Allenville, and Whitewater. It is currently represented by Barry Hovis (R-Whitewater).

District 147 – Consists of most of the city of Cape Girardeau and a small sliver of the mostly rural stretch of Highway 74 to Dutchtown. The seat is currently vacant after Wallingford resigned in January 2022.  

In the Missouri Senate, all of Cape Girardeau County is a part of Missouri's 27h District and is currently represented by Holly Thompson Rehder (R-Sikeston.

Federal
All of Cape Girardeau County is included in Missouri's 8th Congressional District and is currently represented by Jason Smith (R-Salem) in the U.S. House of Representatives. Smith was elected to a fifth term in 2020 over Democratic challenger Kathy Ellis.

Cape Girardeau County, along with the rest of the state of Missouri, is represented in the U.S. Senate by Josh Hawley (R-Columbia) and Roy Blunt (R-Strafford).

Blunt was elected to a second term in 2016 over then-Missouri Secretary of State Jason Kander.

Political culture

Unusually for a rural Southern county (straddling the Mississippi embayment), Cape Girardeau County has generally voted Republican since the Civil War. After voting for Lincoln in 1864 and Grant in 1868, it did vote Democratic four times in a row; but from 1888 on, it has voted Democratic only in Franklin Roosevelt's and Lyndon Johnson's landslides of 1932, 1936, and 1964; in the three-way race in 1912 (when it gave Wilson a plurality); and for Missouri native Harry Truman in 1948.

Like most areas throughout rural Missouri, voters in Cape Girardeau County generally adhere to socially and culturally conservative principles which have influenced their shift to Republicans. In 2004, Missourians voted on a constitutional amendment to define marriage as the union between a man and a woman—it overwhelmingly passed Cape Girardeau County with 83.19 percent of the vote. The initiative passed the state with 71 percent of support, as Missouri became the first state to ban same-sex marriage. In 2006, Cape Girardeau County voted against a state constitutional amendment to fund and legalize embryonic stem cell research, with 63.12 percent opposed. The initiative narrowly passed the state with 51 percent of support, and Missouri became one of the first states to approve such research. Cape Girardeau County's voters have supported such populist causes as increasing the minimum wage. In 2006, Cape Girardeau County voted to increase the minimum wage to $6.50 an hour with 60.04 percent of the vote. The proposition strongly passed every county in Missouri, with 75.94 percent voting in favor. (During the same election, voters in five other states also strongly approved increases in the minimum wage.)

Missouri presidential preference primaries

2020
The 2020 presidential primaries for both the Democratic and Republican parties were held in Missouri on March 10. On the Democratic side, former Vice President Joe Biden (D-Delaware) both won statewide and carried Cape Girardeau County by a wide margin. Biden went on to defeat President Donald Trump in the general election.

Incumbent President Donald Trump (R-Florida) faced a primary challenge from former Massachusetts Governor Bill Weld, but won both Cape Girardeau County and statewide by overwhelming margins.

2016
The 2016 presidential primaries for both the Republican and Democratic parties were held in Missouri on March 15. Businessman Donald Trump (R-New York) narrowly won the state overall, but Senator Ted Cruz (R-Texas) carried a plurality of the vote in Cape Girardeau County. Trump went on to win the nomination and the presidency.

On the Democratic side, former Secretary of State Hillary Clinton (D-New York) narrowly won statewide, but Senator Bernie Sanders (I-Vermont) carried a majority of the vote in Cape Girardeau County.

2012
The 2012 Missouri Republican Presidential Primary's results were nonbinding on the state's national convention delegates. Voters in Cape Girardeau County supported former U.S. Senator Rick Santorum (R-Pennsylvania), who finished first in the state at large, but eventually lost the nomination to former Governor Mitt Romney (R-Massachusetts). Delegates to the congressional district and state conventions were chosen at a county caucus, which selected a delegation favoring Santorum. Incumbent President Barack Obama easily won the Missouri Democratic Primary and renomination. He defeated Romney in the general election.

2008
In 2008, the Missouri Republican Presidential Primary was closely contested, with Senator John McCain (R-Arizona) prevailing and eventually winning the nomination. However, former Governor Mitt Romney (R-Massachusetts) won a plurality in Cape Girardeau County.

Then-Senator Hillary Clinton (D-New York) received more votes than any candidate from either party in Cape Girardeau County during the 2008 presidential primary. Despite initial reports that Clinton had won Missouri, Barack Obama (D-Illinois), also a Senator at the time, narrowly defeated her statewide and later became that year's Democratic nominee, going on to win the presidency.

Communities

Cities
Cape Girardeau (small part in Scott County)
Delta
Jackson (county seat)
Scott City (mostly in Scott County)

Villages

Allenville
Dutchtown
Gordonville
Oak Ridge
Old Appleton
Pocahontas
Whitewater

Unincorporated communities

 Arbor
 Arnsberg
 Bainbridge
 Blomeyer
 Burfordville
 Crump
 Daisy
 Dissen
 Egypt Mills
 Friedheim
 Fruitland
 Gravel Hill
 Hickory Ridge
 Hilderbrand 
 Hines Landing
 Houck
 Kurreville 
 Leemon 
 Millersville
 Moccasin Springs
 Neely's Landing
 New Wells
 Oriole
 Randles
 Rum Branch
 Shawneetown
 Tilsit

Notable people
 Jacob M. Appel, novelist
 William F. Barnes, former head football coach for UCLA
 Leon Brinkopf, former professional baseball player
 Joseph Cable, a Medal of Honor recipient during the American Indian Wars
 Shirley Crites, All-American Girls Professional Baseball League player
 Dale Dye, Actor and retired U.S. Marine
 A.J. Ellis, former Major League Baseball catcher
 John Thomson Faris, clergyman
 Gary Friedrich, writer of the comic book Ghost Rider
 Linda M. Godwin, NASA astronaut and scientist
 Chic Hecht, U.S. Senator from Nevada (1983-1989) and Ambassador to the Bahamas (1989-1993)
 Edwin C. Horrell, American football player and coach
 Andrew Conway Ivy, President of the American Physiological Society (1939–1941)
 Terry Jones, fundamentalist pastor of Dove World Outreach Center
 Peter Kinder, 46th Lieutenant Governor of Missouri (2005–2017)
 Richard Kinder, businessman and co-founder and executive chairman of Kinder Morgan, Inc.
 The Limbaugh family, including political commentators, brothers David and Rush Limbaugh
 Mark Littell, Former professional baseball pitcher
 Fred Henry McGuire, Medal of Honor recipient for his role in the Philippine–American War
 Marie Elizabeth Watkins Oliver, "the Betsy Ross of Missouri," designer and creator of the Missouri State Flag
 Stephanie O'Sullivan, Principal Deputy Director of National Intelligence
 Susan Beth Scott, 2008 and 2012 U.S. Paralympic Medalist Swimmer
 John Locke Scripps, journalist and biographer
 Tony Spinner, guitarist and singer
 Jess Stacy, jazz pianist
 William S. Stone, former Superintendent of the U.S. Air Force Academy
 Billy Swan, singer of #1 hit song "I Can Help" in 1974
 Terry Teachout, writer
 Roy Thomas, comic book writer (Marvel and DC Comics) and editor (Marvel), screenwriter
 Louis C. Wagner, Jr., United States Army four-star general
 Robert Henry Whitelaw, U.S. Congressman from Missouri (1890-1891)

See also
National Register of Historic Places listings in Cape Girardeau County, Missouri

References

External links
 Digitized 1930 Plat Book of Cape Girardeau County  from University of Missouri Division of Special Collections, Archives, and Rare Books

 
Cape Girardeau–Jackson metropolitan area
Missouri counties on the Mississippi River
1812 establishments in Missouri Territory
Populated places established in 1812